The Mechanics Building (also known as the Masonic Building) in Pueblo, Colorado was built in 1891 in Late Victorian style. It was listed on the National Register of Historic Places in 1983.

Description and history 
The building was originally constructed 1890-91 as a commercial office building, with the Mechanics Savings Bank as its main tenant. It was purchased in 1910 by a local Masonic Lodge. The lodge converted some of the space as a meeting hall, and continued to rent the rest as commercial space. The Masons sold the building to The American Furniture Company in 1946, who have been its primary tenant since.

References

Commercial buildings on the National Register of Historic Places in Colorado
Commercial buildings completed in 1891
Former Masonic buildings in Colorado
Clubhouses on the National Register of Historic Places in Colorado
National Register of Historic Places in Pueblo, Colorado